Acheilognathus is a genus of cyprinid fish native to Asia.  The name is derived from the Greek a, meaning "without", the Greek cheilos, meaning "lip", and the Greek gnathos, meaning "jaw".

Morphology 
Fishes of this genus range in length from 5 to 27 cm. They are similar in appearance to fishes of the genus Puntius.

Species
There are currently 41 recognized species in this genus:
Acheilognathus asmussii (Dybowski, 1872) (Russian bitterling)
Acheilognathus barbatulus Günther, 1873
Acheilognathus barbatus Nichols, 1926
Acheilognathus brevicaudatus Y. R. Chen & Z. Y. Li, 1987
Acheilognathus changtingensis Qing Yang, Y. R. Zhu, B. X. Xiong & H. Z. Liu, 2011
Acheilognathus coreanus Steindachner, 1892
Acheilognathus cyanostigma D. S. Jordan & Fowler, 1903 (striped bitterling)
Acheilognathus deignani (H. M. Smith, 1945)
Acheilognathus elongatoides Kottelat, 2001
Acheilognathus elongatus (Regan, 1908) (elongate bitterling)
Acheilognathus fasciodorsalis V. H. Nguyễn, 2001
Acheilognathus gracilis Nichols, 1926
†Acheilognathus hondae (D. S. Jordan & Metz, 1913)
†Acheilognathus hypselonotus (Bleeker, 1871)
Acheilognathus imberbis Günther, 1868
Acheilognathus imfasciodorsalis V. H. Nguyễn, 2001
Acheilognathus kyphus (Đ. Y. Mai, 1978)
Acheilognathus longibarbatus (Đ. Y. Mai, 1978)
Acheilognathus longipinnis Regan, 1905 (deepbody bitterling)
Acheilognathus macromandibularis A. Doi, R. Arai & H. Z. Liu, 1999
Acheilognathus macropterus (Bleeker, 1871)
Acheilognathus majusculus I. S. Kim & H. Yang, 1998
Acheilognathus melanogaster Bleeker, 1860 (Japanese bitterling)
Acheilognathus meridianus (H. W. Wu, 1939)
Acheilognathus microphysa J. X. Yang, X. L. Chu & Y. R. Chen, 1990
Acheilognathus nguyenvanhaoi H. D. Nguyễn, Đ. H. Trần & T. T. Tạ, 2013
Acheilognathus omeiensis (H. J. Shih & T. L. Tchang, 1934)
Acheilognathus peihoensis Fowler, 1910
Acheilognathus polylepis (H. W. Wu, 1964)
Acheilognathus polyspinus (Holčík, 1972)
Acheilognathus rhombeus (Temminck & Schlegel, 1846)
Acheilognathus striatus Qing Yang, B. X. Xiong, Q. Y. Tang & H. Z. Liu, 2010
Acheilognathus tabira D. S. Jordan & W. F. Thompson, 1914
Acheilognathus tabira erythropterus R. Arai, Fujikawa & Nagata, 2007
Acheilognathus tabira jordani R. Arai, Fujikawa & Nagata, 2007
Acheilognathus tabira nakamurae R. Arai, Fujikawa & Nagata, 2007
Acheilognathus tabira tabira D. S. Jordan & W. F. Thompson, 1914
Acheilognathus tabira tohokuensis R. Arai, Fujikawa & Nagata, 2007
Acheilognathus taenianalis (Günther, 1873)
Acheilognathus tonkinensis (Vaillant, 1892)
Acheilognathus typus Bleeker, 1863
Acheilognathus yamatsutae T. Mori, 1928

In addition, there are two undescribed species in Korea awaiting further study:
 Acheilognathus sp.
 Acheilognathus sp. HR

References

 
Taxa named by Pieter Bleeker